Frank Gumbleton (born 6 March 1951) is a former Australian rules footballer who played with the North Melbourne Football Club in the Victorian Football League during the 1970s. Gumbleton was recruited from the country NSW football club of Ganmain. He was a premiership player for Ganmain in 1969.

Gumbleton usually played in the back pocket. A brilliant defender not known for his flair, yet was instrumental in solidifying the tight defensive North Melbourne team of the 1970s. 

Gumbleton played for the Wangaratta Football Club in the Ovens & Murray Football League in 1984.

In later years Gumbleton was a runner for the North Melbourne team.

References

External links

1951 births
Living people
Australian rules footballers from New South Wales
North Melbourne Football Club players
Brunswick Football Club players
North Melbourne Football Club Premiership players
Two-time VFL/AFL Premiership players